Minnesota State Highway 235 (MN 235) was a  highway in west-central Minnesota, which ran from its intersection with Otter Tail County Road 59 in Urbank and continued east to its eastern terminus at its intersection with State Highway 29 in Parkers Prairie. In 2013, the route was removed from the state highway system. The route became an extension of Otter Tail County Road 38.

Route description
Highway 235 served as an east–west connector route in west-central Minnesota between Urbank and Parkers Prairie.

Highway 235 was also known as West Main Street in Parkers Prairie and Main Street in Urbank.

Inspiration Peak State Wayside Park was located 4 miles west of the junction of Highway 235 and County State-Aid Highway 38 at Urbank.  The park entrance is located on County State-Aid Highway 38 in nearby Leaf Mountain Township.

The route was legally defined as Route 235 in the Minnesota Statutes until 2013.

History
Highway 235 was authorized on July 1, 1949.

The eastern half of the route was paved in 1950. The remainder was paved in 1952.

Major intersections

References

External links

Highway 235 at the Unofficial Minnesota Highways Page

235